Alp Alpagut (born 9 January 1974) is a Turkish sailor. He competed in the Laser event at the 1996 Summer Olympics.

References

External links
 

1974 births
Living people
Turkish male sailors (sport)
Olympic sailors of Turkey
Sailors at the 1996 Summer Olympics – Laser
Place of birth missing (living people)